Jamie Irvine is a New Zealand actor who has appeared in theatre productions, films and television.

Career
Irvine has a Bachelor of Arts (Theatre and Film) from Victoria University of Wellington. He was a student at NIDA from 2003 to 2005 where he gained a Bachelor of Dramatic Art (Acting) 

He was the recipient of a Mike Walsh Fellowship Special Grant in 2009. He used the money to, "train in New York with Susan Batson and at the Stella Adler Studio".

Known for the role of Detective Ben Charlton on TV3's Underbelly NZ: Land of the Long Green Cloud (2011)  He has appeared in a number of short films and on Australian television.

He has provided voice overs in Australia and New Zealand. On an agents site he is described as,  "... brings a great deal of versatility to his work, whether it’s a high-energy retail read, a great soft sell voice, narration or a character read."

Filmography

Film

Television

Theatre
Selected productions

References

Living people
New Zealand male television actors
New Zealand male film actors
Year of birth missing (living people)